Coffee furanone (2-methyltetrahydrofuran-3-one) is a pleasant smelling liquid furan derivative which is a volatile constituent of the aroma complex of roasted coffee. Coffee furanone is less odorous than furfuryl mercaptan, which with an odor threshold of 0.005 ppb was the first high impact aroma chemical, but has a very pleasant sweet caramel character, with some nuttiness.

Synthesis 
Coffee furnone was synthesized in 1963 by Wynberg via acid-catalyzed ring closure of β-alkoxy diazoketones. Coffee furanone has also been prepared via the condensation of ethyl lactate and methyl acrylate in DMSO solution and (under phase transfer conditions) in ionic liquids. A related lactic acid synthesis was described as having the advantages of a simple process, high conversion rate, low pollution, and low cost.  This compound has also been prepared in acceptable yield via oxidative hydroxylation of the 2-acetylbutyrolactone. Further approaches to the synthesis of coffee furanone involved the hydrolysis of the corresponding dithioketals and the oxidation of 2-methyltetrahydrofuran employing lithium hypochlorite in the presence of ruthenium catalysts.

Applications 
The synthetic version of this natural flavorant and odorant is used in a variety of food and beverage applications, including coffee, nuts, cocoa, brandy, meat sauces and as a general food flavorant at a typical dosage (about 5-20 ppm), similar to the natural concentration (30 ppm) of coffee furanone in roasted coffee.

References 

Tetrahydrofurans
Ketones